Dancourt may refer to:

 Florent Carton Dancourt (1661-1725), French dramatist and actor
 Louis Hurtaut Dancourt (1725–1801), French librettist, dramatist, and actor
 Dancourt, a commune of the Seine-Maritime département, in France